Banished may refer to:

 Banished (TV series), a 2015 drama television series
 Banished (film), a 2007 documentary
 Banished (video game), a city-building strategy game by Shining Rock Software
 Banished (Halo), an alien faction in the Halo series

See also
Banish (disambiguation)